HMS Acheron was an  destroyer of the Royal Navy. She served during the Second World War in Home waters and off the Norwegian coast, before becoming an early war loss when she sank after hitting a mine off the Isle of Wight on 17 December 1940. The wreck site is designated under the Protection of Military Remains Act 1986.

Construction and commissioning
Acheron was ordered on 29 May 1928 from the yards of John I. Thornycroft & Company, Woolston, Hampshire under the 1927 Naval Estimates. She was laid down on 29 October 1928 and was launched a year later on 18 March 1930. She was commissioned on 13 October 1931. She suffered from a number of mechanical problems which became evident in the first year of her service and would go on to plague her for the whole of her service, despite a succession of modifications and refits. When the Second World War broke out in September 1939, she was under repair at Portsmouth and was not able to take up her war station until December 1939.

Wartime career
On completion of repairs and refit, she joined the 16th Destroyer Flotilla of the Home Fleet at Scapa Flow on 23 March 1940. The flotilla was then deployed in the North Western Approaches and the North Sea. After the German invasion of Norway on 9 April 1940, Acheron was deployed with the flotilla on convoy defence and fleet screening duties in support of the military landings in Norway. The cruisers then landed troops at Åndalsnes and Molde. On arrival on at Åndalsnes on 18 April, Acheron was detached and deployed on patrol and escort duties.

This was completed by 9 June, whereupon Acheron resumed her normal duties with the flotilla. She then operated in the English Channel to escort convoys and was in dock at Portsmouth on 21 June to have a  AA gun fitted to improve her anti-aircraft defence.

She began repairs at Portsmouth Dockyard on 6 August, but on 24 August she was seriously damaged during an air raid which killed two of her crew and injured another three. One bomb hit her aft section and exploded, causing severe damage to her machinery, "Y" gun and superstructure. This caused her repairs to be extended until October, with her "Y" gun being replaced by a mounting from the destroyer , which had been damaged in June. In November, Acheron was nominated for service as gunnery training destroyer.

Sinking
Repairs were fully completed by 2 December, and she began post-refit trials. On 17 December, she was sailing off the Isle of Wight. The trial was being conducted at night, in heavy seas and with a strong north-east wind in complete darkness. On one of the passes, she struck a mine. The explosion caused major structural damage forward, and her own speed drove her under. She sank within four minutes, taking 196 crewmen and yard workers, who were on board for the trials, to the bottom. There were only 19 survivors. The mine was probably one of those laid by the Luftwaffe along the Channel coast in no apparent pattern. Her sinking was not made public until 27 December 1940.

The wreck site was designated as a Protected Place under the Protection of Military Remains Act 1986 in 2006.

Notes

References

External links
 HMS Acheron at Uboat.net
 HMS ACHERON - A-class Destroyer
 

 

A- and B-class destroyers
Ships built in Southampton
1930 ships
World War II destroyers of the United Kingdom
World War II shipwrecks in the English Channel
Protected Wrecks of the United Kingdom
Maritime incidents in December 1940
Ships sunk by mines
Ships built by John I. Thornycroft & Company